Rashad Mammadov (born 23 July 1974) is an ethnic Azerbaijani judoka from Belarus.

Achievements

References

External links
 

1974 births
Living people
Belarusian people of Azerbaijani descent
Belarusian male judoka